Garrett Uhlenbrock, (born Garrett James Uhlenbrock, 21 August 1964) aka Skinny Bones is an American punk rock musician and songwriter, best known for co-writing songs for the New York based band, the Ramones.

Record producer Bill Laswell introduced Uhlenbrock to Dee Dee Ramone in 1989. In 1990 Uhlenbrock and Dee Dee Ramone co-wrote the first version of "Poison Heart", which was later recorded by the Ramones on their Mondo Bizarro album. Shortly after Uhlenbrock wrote "The Job That Ate My Brain", and "Anxiety" with Marky Ramone for the same Ramones album (RARD10615 Radioactive Records), which was released in 1992.

In 1995, Uhlenbrock and Marky Ramone co-wrote "Have A Nice Day", which was recorded by the Ramones for the ¡Adios Amigos!  album (RARD11273 Radioactive Records). "Anxiety" and "Have A Nice Day" were the shortest songs on both records.

In 1996, Uhlenbrock played guitar on the album, About to Choke, by Vic Chesnutt for Capitol Records. Two years later he played slide guitar on the V2 Records album, Deserter's Songs, by Mercury Rev.

In 1996, he and Marky Ramone founded the band called Marky Ramone and the Intruders. That same year they released the self-titled album on Blackout! Records (produced by Marky Ramone, Skinny Bones and Mark Neuman). The cover art of this album is an advertising poster for the 1958 science fiction movie, Attack of the 50 ft. Woman. In November 1996, the band went to Brazil, and opened for the Sex Pistols during their first reunion tour "Filthy Lucre Tour". In 1999, their second album The Answer to Your Problems? was recorded. One song featured guest vocals by Joan Jett.

In 2009, Uhlenbrock recorded Shot My TV with his group Skinny Bones and the Gonedaddys for the Italian punk label, Nicotine Records.

In 2018, Uhlenbrock recorded Lake Monona and  We Go Back Like Car Seats with his group Owlbrook on Bandcamp.com, Bandcamp.

References

1964 births
Living people
American male songwriters
American punk rock guitarists
Ramones
American male guitarists
20th-century American guitarists